Shahrasazi Tazareh (also Romanized as Shahrsāzī Ţazareh) is a village in Damankuh Rural District, in the Central District of Damghan County, Semnan Province, Iran. At the 2006 census, its population was 413, in 96 families.

References 

Populated places in Damghan County